Bakshirhat is a neighbourhood in the Tufanganj II CD block in the Tufanganj subdivision of the Cooch Behar district  in the state of West Bengal, India.

Geography

Location

Bakshirhat is not identified in 2011 census as a separate inhabited place but the place has a post office and a police station by that name. Census maps do not show Bakshirhat police station, but it is mentioned in Cooch Behar police records. Google maps show both Chhota Laukuthi and Bakshirhat as adjacent places. (Please see references given below)

Area overview
The map alongside shows the eastern part of the district. In Tufanganj subdivision 6.97% of the population lives in the urban areas and 93.02% lives in the rural areas. In Dinhata subdivision 5.98% of the population lives in the urban areas and 94.02% lives in the urban areas. The entire district forms the flat alluvial flood plains of mighty rivers.

Note: The map alongside presents some of the notable locations in the subdivisions. All places marked in the map are linked in the larger full screen map.

Civic administration

Police station
There is a police station at Bakshirhat.

Transport
There is a station  Boxirhat Railway Station on the New Cooch Behar-Golokganj branch line. Apart from local connections, there are trains such as Siliguri-Dhubri DEMU which passes through the Dooars.

Education
Bakshirhat Mahavidyalaya was established in 2005. Affiliated with the  Cooch Behar Panchanan Barma University, it offers honours courses in Bengali, English, Sanskrit, philosophy, history and geography, and a general course in arts.

Healthcare
Bakshirhat Block Primary Health Centre, with 10 beds at Bakshirhat, is the major government medical facility in the Tufanganj II CD block.

References

Villages in Cooch Behar district